is a train station in the city of Toyota, Aichi Prefecture, Japan, operated by Meitetsu.

Lines

Station layout
The station has two opposed side platforms located underground, with the station building constructed above. The station has automated ticket machines, Manaca automated turnstiles and is staffed.

Platforms

Adjacent stations

|-
!colspan=5|Nagoya Railroad

Station history
Jōsui Station was opened on July 29, 1979.

Passenger statistics
In fiscal 2017, the station was used by an average of 11,461 passengers daily.

Surrounding area
Toyota High School
 Jōsui Junior High School
 Jōsui Elementary School

See also
 List of Railway Stations in Japan

References

External links

 Official web page 

Railway stations in Japan opened in 1979
Railway stations in Aichi Prefecture
Stations of Nagoya Railroad
Toyota, Aichi